1983 Dhilwan Bus massacre was a massacre of 6 Hindus by unidentified extremists.  It occurred on 5 October 1983, when a bus going from Dhilwan in Kapurthala district to Jalandhar was attacked by unidentified militants in which six Hindu passengers were shot dead in Dhilwan in the northern state of Punjab, India.

Aftermath
Due to the deteriorating law and order situation in Punjab, the Congress led State government was dismissed and  President's rule was imposed on the next evening post massacre.

Jarnail Singh Bhindranwale had condemned the incident.

See also 
1991 Punjab killings

References 

Massacres in 1983
October 1983 events in Asia
October 1983 crimes
Mass shootings in India
Insurgency in Punjab
Dhilwan bus massacre, 1983
Terrorism in Punjab, India
Dhilwan bus massacre, 1983
Terrorist incidents on buses in Asia
Sikh terrorism in India
Khalistan movement
Kapurthala district
1983 mass shootings in Asia
1983 murders in India